Pintalia vibex is a species of cixiid planthopper in the family Cixiidae.

References

Further reading

External links

 
 

Cixiidae